Gloria Rodríguez (1970 – November 6, 2022), better known by her stage name Hurricane G, was an American rapper of Puerto Rican descent. Her 1997 single release "Somebody Else" charted at #10 by Billboard Magazine on Hot Rap Singles,  and at #54 on their Hot R&B/Hip-Hop Singles & Tracks chart.

Biography 
Rodríguez was born in Brooklyn, New York City in 1970. She was the Hit Squad's first female member, and made guest appearances on albums by Keith Murray, Redman, Xzibit, Delinquent Habits, Funkdoobiest,  the Cocoa Brovaz, and others. She also appeared on Puff Daddy's track "P.E. 2000". Her much-delayed debut album, All Woman, was released in 1997.

Hurricane G died in hospice from lung cancer on November 6, 2022, at the age of 52. She is survived by her daughter, Lexus.

Discography

Studio albums 
 All Woman (1997)
 Mami & Papi with Thirstin Howl III (2013)

Singles 
 "Padre Nuestro (Our Father)" on Red Hot + Latin: Silencio = Muerte
 "Somebody Else"
 2004 feature from the Tony Touch album The Reggaetony Album

References

External links 
 [ Hurricane G at Allmusic.com]
Hurricane G on Myspace

1970 births
2022 deaths
Date of birth missing
American people of Puerto Rican descent
American women rappers
Musicians from Brooklyn
Rappers from New York (state)
People from Flatbush, Brooklyn
Puerto Rican women rappers
20th-century American rappers
21st-century American rappers
20th-century American women musicians
21st-century American women musicians
Def Squad members
Hit Squad members
20th-century women rappers
21st-century women rappers